Bojanów  is a village in Stalowa Wola County, Subcarpathian Voivodeship, in south-eastern Poland. It is the seat of the gmina (administrative district) called Gmina Bojanów.

The village has a population of 1,200.

References

Villages in Stalowa Wola County